Steve Buxton may refer to:

 Steve Buxton (American football)
 Steve Buxton (footballer, born 1888) (1888–1953), English football left back
 Steve Buxton (footballer, born 1960), English football forward